Demario Davis (born January 11, 1989) is an American football linebacker for the New Orleans Saints of the National Football League (NFL). He was drafted by the New York Jets in the third round of the 2012 NFL Draft. He played college football at Arkansas State.

Early years
Davis' mother gave birth to him when she was 16, and his father was a career enlisted soldier in the US Army and combat veteran. Davis attended Brandon High School in Brandon, Mississippi, where he was a three-sport athlete in football, basketball, and track. In football, he played mostly wide receiver as sophomore and junior, helping lead the team to its 14th playoff appearance in the last 16 years with a 7–5 record. As a senior, he recorded 81 tackles, six interceptions and one sack, while also receiving over 30 passes for 386 receiving yards with four scores. He was also a starter on the Brandon basketball team and competed as a high jumper with the varsity track & field team. He was named to the Clarion Ledger All-Metro team in football.

Davis played college football for the Arkansas State Red Wolves. He recorded a team-leading 80 tackles as a sophomore and earned various all-conference honors in his junior and senior years.

Professional career
Davis attended the NFL Scouting Combine in Indianapolis, Indiana and completed all of the combine and positional drills. On March 27, 2012, he attended Arkansas State's pro day and chose to perform the 40-yard dash (4.52s), 20-yard dash (2.72s), 10-yard dash (1.63s), vertical jump (38.5"), and positional drills. At the conclusion of the pre-draft process, Davis was projected to be a third round pick by the majority of NFL draft experts and scouts. He was ranked as the ninth best outside linebacker prospect in the draft by DraftScout.com.

New York Jets
The New York Jets selected Davis in the third round (77th overall) of the 2012 NFL Draft. Davis was the tenth linebacker drafted in 2012.

2012
On May 31, 2012, the New York Jets signed Davis to a four-year, $2.81 million contract with a signing bonus of $618,000.

Throughout training camp, Davis competed against veteran Bart Scott for the job as the starting weakside linebacker. Head coach Rex Ryan named Davis the third-string backup weakside linebacker to start the regular season, behind Bart Scott and Josh Mauga.

He made his professional regular season debut in the Jets' season-opening 48–28 victory against the Buffalo Bills. On September 23, 2012, Davis made his first career tackle during a one-yard punt return by Marcus Thigpen in the first quarter of a 23–20 overtime victory at the Miami Dolphins in Week 3. In Week 6, Davis was promoted to the Jets' primary backup weakside linebacker role after Josh Mauga was placed on injured reserve after tearing a pectoral muscle the previous week. On October 21, 2012, Davis earned his first career start in place of Bart Scott and recorded a season-high seven combined tackles during a 29–26 loss at the New England Patriots in Week 7. He remained as the starting weakside linebacker for the next two games (Weeks 8–10) as Bart Scott recovered from a toe injury he sustained in Week 7. He registered 15 of his tackles while playing on special teams.

2013
Davis entered training camp slated as a starting inside linebacker after the Jets' new defensive coordinator Dennis Thurman switched from a base 4–3 defense to a base 3–4 defense. Head coach Rex Ryan named Davis and David Harris the starting inside linebackers to begin the regular season in 2013.

He started in the Jets' season-opener against the Tampa Bay Buccaneers and recorded eight combined tackles in their 18–17 victory. On September 22, 2013, Davis collected six combined tackles and made his first career sack during a 27–20 win against the Buffalo Bills in Week 3. He sacked quarterback E. J. Manuel for a three-yard loss in the third quarter. On November 3, 2013, Davis made four tackles, deflected a pass, and made his first career interception during a 26–20 win against the New Orleans Saints in Week 9. He intercepted a pass thrown by quarterback Drew Brees that was originally intended for Benjamin Watson and was tackled for no gain in the first quarter. In Week 13, he collected a season-high ten combined tackles (six solo) in the Jets' 23–3 loss to the Miami Dolphins. He finished the season with 107 combined tackles (63 solo), a pass deflection, a sack, and an interception in 16 games and 16 starts.

2014
Head coach Rex Ryan retained Davis and David Harris as the starting inside linebackers to begin the 2014 season, along with outside linebackers Calvin Pace and Quinton Coples. On September 14, 2014, Davis recorded six combined tackles and sacked quarterback Aaron Rodgers twice in the Jets' 31–24 loss at the Green Bay Packers in Week 2. In Week 10, he collected a season-high 12 combined tackles (11 solo) and broke up a pass during a 20–13 victory against the Pittsburgh Steelers. It was his fourth game with over ten combined tackles in 2014. He finished his third season with 116 combined tackles (79 solo), five pass deflections, and 3.5 sacks in 16 games and 16 starts. On December 30, 2014, New York Jets' owner Woody Johnson fired general manager John Idzik and head coach Rex Ryan after the Jets finished with a 4–12 record in 2014.

2015
Head coach Todd Bowles chose to retain the Jets' starting linebackers and officially named Davis, Harris, Coples, and Pace the starters to begin the regular season. In Week 3, he collected a season-high 13 combined tackles (six solo) in the Jets' 24–17 loss to the Philadelphia Eagles. The following week, Davis made a season-high two pass deflections and a tackle during a 27–14 win at the Miami Dolphins in Week 4. Davis finished the  season with 90 combined tackles (57 solo), two pass deflections, and two sacks in 16 games and 16 starts. Although the Jets finished second in the AFC East with a 10–6 record they did not qualify for the playoffs. He earned the 15th highest overall grade among 60 qualifying inside linebackers by Pro Football Focus.

Cleveland Browns

2016

Davis became an unrestricted free agent after the 2015 season and reportedly received interest with multiple teams, including the Cleveland Browns.

On March 16, 2016, the Cleveland Browns signed Davis to a two-year, $8 million contract that includes $4.10 million guaranteed and a signing bonus of $2 million. Head coach Hue Jackson named Davis and Christian Kirksey the starting inside linebackers to begin the regular season, along with outside linebackers Nate Orchard and Emmanuel Ogbah.

He made his Cleveland Browns' regular season debut in their season-opener at the Philadelphia Eagles and recorded seven combined tackles in their 29–10 loss. In Week 10, Davis recorded three combined tackles and sacked quarterback Joe Flacco during a 28–7 loss at the Baltimore Ravens. On December 18, 2016, Davis collected a season-high tying ten combined tackles (eight solo) in the Browns' 33–13 loss at the Buffalo Bills in Week 15. He finished his only season with the Cleveland Browns with 99 combined tackles (59 solo), two pass deflections, and two sacks in 16 games and 16 starts.

New York Jets (second stint)

2017
On June 1, 2017, the Cleveland Browns traded Davis to the New York Jets in exchange for Calvin Pryor. Davis became expendable after Browns' defensive coordinator Gregg Williams switched to a base 4–3 defense that required a single middle linebacker. They also acquired Jamie Collins from the New England Patriots and had Christian Kirksey and Joe Schobert develop into viable starters.

He entered training camp slated as a starting inside linebacker, but saw competition from Bruce Carter, Julian Stanford, Spencer Paysinger, Frank Beltre, and Connor Harris. Head coach Todd Bowles named Davis and Darron Lee the starting inside linebackers to begin the regular season.

He started in the Jets' season-opener at the Buffalo Bills and collected a season-high 14 combined tackles (eight solo) and was credited for half a sack in their 21–12 loss. On September 24, 2017, he recorded a season-high 11 solo tackles, assisted on a tackle, and deflected a pass in the Jets' 20–6 win against the Miami Dolphins in Week 3. In Week 14, Davis collected 13 combined tackles (ten solo) and half a sack during a 23–0 loss at the Denver Broncos. He finished the  season with a career-high 135 combined tackles (97 solo), a career-high five sacks, and three pass deflections in 16 games and 16 starts. His 135 combined tackles finished sixth in the league in 2017. He earned an overall grade of 87.3 from Pro Football Focus and received the eighth highest among all qualified linebackers in 2017.

New Orleans Saints

2018
Davis became an unrestricted free agent in 2018 and received interest from multiple teams as he was considered to be the top linebacker available in free agency. Davis stated he intended to return to New York and considered the Jets his home. The Jets and Davis failed to reach an agreement and Davis claimed the Jets never officially made him contract offer, but it was possibly due to his asking price. On March 19, 2018, the New Orleans Saints signed Davis to a three-year, $24 million contract with $16 million guaranteed and a signing bonus of $9.20 million.

In Week 4, Davis recorded 11 tackles, two for a loss, and two sacks in a 33–18 win over the New York Giants, earning him NFC Defensive Player of the Week.

2019
In week 10 against the Atlanta Falcons, Davis recorded a team high 11 tackles and sacked Matt Ryan once in the 26–18 win.

2020
On September 12, 2020, Davis signed a three-year, $27 million contract extension with the Saints.

In Week 1 against the Tampa Bay Buccaneers, Davis recorded his first sack of the season on Tom Brady in the 34–23 win. In the Week 3 against the Green Bay Packers, Davis sacked Aaron Rodgers in the 37–30 loss.
In Week 10 against the San Francisco 49ers, Davis recorded a team high 12 tackles and sacked Nick Mullens once during the 27–13 win.

NFL career statistics

Regular season

Personal life
Davis is a devout Christian. His cousin was former NFL quarterback Steve McNair. Davis married in 2012 and has five children. During the 2019 season, Davis was fined $7,000 by the NFL for wearing a headband in Week 3 with the words "Man of God" on it, though the fine was later repealed.

References

External links
 
 Arkansas State Red Wolves bio
 New York Jets bio

1989 births
Living people
African-American players of American football
American football linebackers
Arkansas State Red Wolves football players
Cleveland Browns players
New Orleans Saints players
New York Jets players
People from Brandon, Mississippi
People from Collins, Mississippi
Players of American football from Mississippi
21st-century African-American sportspeople
20th-century African-American people
National Conference Pro Bowl players